Lobothallia alphoplaca, the variable sunken disk lichen, is a creamy gray to brown, placodioid areolate  lichen that grows on rock in on rock and sometimes moss. It prefers growing on siliceous rocks. It is found in Europe, central Asia, and North America, where it grows in the southwestern deserts to central California. The center has numerous crowded and deformed apothecia with rims of thallus-like tissue (lecanorine). With dark reddish or grayish brown to black discs. Lichen spot tests on the thallus and apothecia are C−, and KC−, with tests on the cortex K+ red, P+ orange, or K−, P− and on the medulla K+ red, and P+ orange. It produces norstictic acid, constictic acid, or salazinic acid as secondary metabolites.

References

Pertusariales
Lichen species
Lichens described in 1803
Lichens of Asia
Lichens of Europe
Lichens of North America